Vinod Gudadhe Patil is an Indian politician and was a member of the Bharatiya Janata Party. Gudadhe Patil was a member of the Maharashtra Legislative Assembly from the Nagpur West constituency in Nagpur district. He was minister Ministers of State in Narayan Rane ministry

References 

Bharatiya Janata Party politicians from Maharashtra
Members of the Maharashtra Legislative Assembly
Living people
21st-century Indian politicians
Politicians from Nagpur
Year of birth missing (living people)